Patrik Jonas Andersson (born 18 August 1971) is a Swedish former professional footballer who played as a defender.

Starting off his career with Malmö FF in the late 1980s, he went on to play professionally in England, Germany, and Spain, and won the 2000–01 UEFA Champions League with FC Bayern Munich. He returned to Malmö FF in 2004 before retiring the following season.

A full international between 1992 and 2002, he won 96 caps for the Sweden national team and was a part of the Sweden team that finished third at the 1994 FIFA World Cup. He also played at the 1992 Summer Olympics, UEFA Euro 1992, UEFA Euro 2000, and was a squad player at the 2002 FIFA World Cup.

He was awarded Guldbollen as the Sweden's best footballer of the year in 1995 and 2001.

Club career

Early career
Born in Bjärred, Andersson began his career with the local club, Bjärreds IF. In 1988, he moved on to Allsvenskan club Malmö FF.

Blackburn Rovers
In December 1992, Andersson went professional as he moved to Blackburn Rovers for a fee of £800,000, where he stayed for one year, making just 12 Premier League appearances. However, he is notable for being one of the first foreign signings by Blackburn Rovers, and one of the relatively small group of foreigners who appeared in the first season of the new Premier League in England. He scored once for Blackburn, in a 2–1 defeat to Sheffield Wednesday in the second leg of the 1992–93 Football League Cup semi-final.

Borussia Mönchengladbach
His next step was to go to Germany in October 1993 and play for Borussia Mönchengladbach. There he won the DFB-Pokal with the team in 1995, but left the team, as its performance deteriorated, in 1999.

Bayern Munich
In June 1999, Andersson signed for Bayern Munich for approximately DM 6 million. He made his debut on 22 August 1999 in a 2–0 away defeat to Bayer Leverkusen. His time with Bayern resulted in two Bundesliga championships (in the 2000–01 championship season he scored the final and decisive goal against Hamburger SV in the last minute – his only goal for the club) as well as a DFB-Pokal and victory in the 2000–01 UEFA Champions League, despite missing his penalty in the final shootout.

FC Barcelona

Andersson moved to La Liga giants FC Barcelona in 2001 and spent three injury-plagued seasons there. Therefore he played only 19 league matches for the Blaugrana.

Malmö FF
For the 2004 season, Andersson came back to Malmö FF to play in the Swedish league again after 10 years. This year he captained Malmö FF who won their first Swedish league (Allsvenskan) title in 15 years. He has twice been awarded Guldbollen as the Swedish footballer of the year, in 1995 and 2001. After suffering yet another knee injury during a Champions League qualifier against Swiss team FC Thun on 10 August 2005, Andersson announced his retirement from professional football on 12 August 2005.

International career
Andersson earned a total of 96 caps for the Swedish national team, scoring three goals. He won a bronze medal in the 1994 FIFA World Cup. Andersson also played in the team that reached the semi-finals at UEFA Euro 1992. He was also part of the Swedish national squad that took part in Euro 2000, the 2002 FIFA World Cup and was a member of the Swedish squad that competed at the 1992 Summer Olympics in Barcelona. At Euro 2000, he received a red card for a hard foul on Belgium's Bart Goor. At the 2002 World Cup, in Sweden's last training session before their opening match against England, Andersson was injured and was not able to play in the tournament. He was replaced by Andreas Jakobsson.

Post-playing career 
He was appointed as Manchester United's scout in Scandinavia in August 2010. He left the club after one year.

Personal life 
Andersson is the son of Roy Andersson, who played more than 300 games for Malmö FF and won 20 caps for the Sweden national team, representing them at the 1978 FIFA World Cup. His brother is Daniel Andersson, also a former professional footballer and Sweden international.

Career statistics

Club

International

Scores and results list Sweden's goal tally first, score column indicates score after each Andersson goal.

Honours
Borussia Mönchengladbach
 DFB-Pokal: 1994–95

Bayern Munich
 Bundesliga: 1999–2000, 2000–01
 DFB-Pokal: 1999–2000
 DFB-Ligapokal: 1999, 2000
 UEFA Champions League: 2000–01

Malmö FF
 Allsvenskan: 2004

Sweden
 FIFA World Cup third place: 1994

Individual
 kicker Bundesliga Team of the Season: 1994–95, 1996–97
 UEFA Team of the Year: 2001
 Swedish Defender of the Year:  2001
 Guldbollen: 1995, 2001

References

External links
 
 

1971 births
Living people
People from Lomma Municipality
Swedish footballers
Footballers from Skåne County
Association football central defenders
Sweden international footballers
Sweden under-21 international footballers
Sweden youth international footballers
Olympic footballers of Sweden
Footballers at the 1992 Summer Olympics
UEFA Euro 1992 players
1994 FIFA World Cup players
UEFA Euro 2000 players
2002 FIFA World Cup players
UEFA Champions League winning players
Allsvenskan players
Premier League players
Bundesliga players
La Liga players
Malmö FF players
Blackburn Rovers F.C. players
Borussia Mönchengladbach players
FC Bayern Munich footballers
FC Barcelona players
Manchester United F.C. non-playing staff
Swedish expatriate footballers
Swedish expatriate sportspeople in England
Expatriate footballers in England
Swedish expatriate sportspeople in Germany
Expatriate footballers in Germany
Swedish expatriate sportspeople in Spain
Expatriate footballers in Spain